Bir Dhadoli is a village near Lakhpur, Tehsil Phagwara, Kapurthala district, in Punjab, India.

Demographics
According to the 2001 Census, Bir Dhadoli has a population of 246 people. Neighbouring villages include Dhadoli, Lakhpur, Dhadday, Chak Prema, and Rawal Pindi.

References

Villages in Kapurthala district